The following is a list of films originally produced and/or distributed theatrically by Paramount Pictures and released in the 1930s. All films (with few exceptions) are currently owned by Universal Television who manages the current distribution through EMKA, Ltd.

References

External links
 Paramount Pictures Complete Library

 1930-1939
American films by studio
1930s in American cinema
Lists of 1930s films